Ralph Raymond Kimbell (12 June 1884 – 4 August 1964) was an English cricketer.  Kimbell's batting and bowling styles are unknown.  He was born in Boughton, Northamptonshire.

Kimbell played his only first-class match for Northamptonshire in the 1908 County Championship against Essex.  In this match, he was dismissed for a duck by Johnny Douglas in Northamptonshire's first-innings.  In their second-innings he was dismissed for 4 runs by Bill Reeves.  With the ball, he took 2 wickets, those of Arnold Read and Walter Mead in the Essex first-innings.

Gilbert later made 2 Minor Counties Championship appearances in 1925 for Oxfordshire against Monmouthshire and Berkshire.  He died on 4 August 1963.

References

External links
Ralph Kimbell at ESPNcricinfo
Ralph Kimbell at CricketArchive

1884 births
1963 deaths
People from West Northamptonshire District
English cricketers
Northamptonshire cricketers
Oxfordshire cricketers